Dictyolimon is a genus of flowering plants belonging to the family Plumbaginaceae.

Its native range is Eastern Afghanistan to Western Pakistan.

Species:

Dictyolimon gilesii 
Dictyolimon griffithii 
Dictyolimon macrorrhabdos

References

Plumbaginaceae
Caryophyllales genera